Marino College of Further Education is situated in Connolly House on the North Strand, Dublin. The College is adjacent to the memorial park commemorating the bombing of this area by a German Bomber in May 1941. Run by the City of Dublin VEC, Marino College was one of the first colleges in Ireland to offer Post Leaving Certificate (PLC) vocational programmes. Its pre-nursing course dates from the early 1980s. The courses are certified by a number of bodies including QQI and ITEC.

The college was four Faculties: Health & Childcare, Business & Administration, Beauty and Creative Studies.

The college's branch in Fairview , is primarily a secondary school but also hosts evening classes.

Courses
The Creative Studies Department currently has five courses: Photography, Photojournalism, Graphic Arts, TV & Film, and Theatre Studies - Drama & Dance. Two new courses are planned for the academic year 2010-2011- a FETAC level 5 Fashion Industry Practice course and an Advanced Certificate in Media Production (FETAC Level 6) course combining writing for film and radio documentary and Documentary Photography. The Certificate in Photography Course (FETAC Level 5) has been in existence since 1985 and over the years has produced a number of professional photographers working in a number of fields. It is tutored by Frank Barr. The photojournalism course has been in existence since 2002.

The Theatre Performance Course features a writer in residence, the playwright Niamh Gleeson and a professional theatre company - The Five Lamps Theatre Company. A number of Five Lamps Theatre Company Productions written by Niamh Gleeson have toured Ireland.  They include The Telephone Exchange, The Mariettas and Aisling and Pavel. Stephanie Behan, Andrea Cleary, Danielle Dornier and Emma Reinhardt are all ex-Marino students currently working as actors in Ireland.

Marino College of Further Education is home to The Five Lamps Arts Festival now in its third year which every April organises art and photography events as well as musical and theatrical performances in the north inner city area.

In May 2019, Sabina Higgins (wife of President Higgins) attended the College's annual graduation ceremony in Croke Park.

References

Further education colleges in the Republic of Ireland
Further education colleges in Dublin (city)